Rudi Frigo (born 31 January 1974) is a former Australian rules footballer who played with the Brisbane Bears in the Australian Football League (AFL).

Frigo was a key position player, occasionally called on to ruck. After the 1991 AFL season concluded, Frigo was one of eight young Queensland based players who were signed by Brisbane as "zone clearing" concession picks.

Originally from Queensland Australian Football League (QAFL) club Mayne, Frigo made his senior AFL debut midway through the 1994 AFL season, making seven appearances that year. He played just one more game in 1995 and finished his league career with a rare statistic for a Bears player; playing in more wins than losses.

Following his delisting by Brisbane, Frigo moved to Adelaide to play with South Australian National Football League (SANFL) club Woodville-West Torrens.

References

External links
 
 

1974 births
Australian rules footballers from Queensland
Brisbane Bears players
Mayne Australian Football Club players
 Woodville-West Torrens Football Club players
Living people